Komafudō Daisuke (born 15 September 1967 as Kazuhito Araki) is a former sumo wrestler from Toyama City, Toyama, Japan. He made his professional debut in January 1984 and reached the top division in September 1989. His highest rank was maegashira 13. He left the sumo world upon retirement from active competition in November 1995.

Career record

See also
Glossary of sumo terms
List of past sumo wrestlers
List of sumo tournament second division champions

References

1967 births
Living people
Japanese sumo wrestlers
Sumo people from Toyama Prefecture